Atka Glacier is the glacier immediately east of Flagship Mountain, draining north into Fry Glacier in Victoria Land. It was discovered and named in 1957 by the New Zealand Northern Survey Party of the Commonwealth Trans-Antarctic Expedition, 1956–58, and named after USS Atka, an American icebreaker in the convoy to McMurdo Sound in the 1956–57 season.

See also
 List of glaciers in the Antarctic
 Glaciology

References
 

Glaciers of Scott Coast